Tyarrpecinus rothi is an extinct thylacinid marsupial that lived during the late Miocene and has been found at the Alcoota scientific reserve in the Northern Territory.  The specific name honors Karl Roth for his contributions to the natural history of central Australia.

T. rothi is known from a holotype left maxillary fragment and was reassembled from a concentration of small bone and tooth fragments. Most of the fragments exhibit chemical erosion and have a layer of calcite.

Taxonomy 
The description of a new species and genus was published in 2000, the results of examination of fossil material discovered at the "Blast Site", associated with the Bullock Creek fossil beds in the Northern Territory. The describing authors, Peter F. Murray and Dirk Megirian, assigned the name Tyarrpecinus to the new thylacinid genus, combining the Ancient Greek kynos, alluding to the canid family of dogs and wolves, and tyarrpa from the Arrente language for "cracked", alluding to the condition of the holotype.
The fossil material described by the authors was a left maxilla, and remains of some teeth, which had been severely fragmented while in its state of deposition.

References

External links
Natural Worlds

Prehistoric thylacines
Miocene marsupials
Prehistoric marsupial genera